Brenebon soup or bruinebonensoep is a kidney beans soup commonly found in the Eastern Indonesia, more often specifically associated with Manado cuisine of North Sulawesi. The soup is made from kidney beans with vegetables served in broth seasoned with garlic, pepper and other spices.

Origin
The dish is derived from Dutch Cuisine influence on colonial Indonesia, adopted by people of Eastern Indonesian provinces. The name "brenebon" is local Manado pronunciation of Dutch bruine bonen; bruine means "brown", while  bonen means "beans", thus bruine bonen means "brown beans" or "red beans" (kidney beans).

Ingredients
The meat used for brenebon is usually washed and soaked in water overnight. The meat is then boiled until tender. The kidney beans are then boiled in the broth with spices, typically shallot, garlic, salt, sugar, pepper, nutmeg, and clove. Then, vegetables such as green beans, celery, and scallion are added. Then the soup is usually served with steamed rice and sambal.

In its original Dutch and Minahasa version, pig trotters are usually employed as the base of rich and thick soup broth. The rich gelatinous pig trotters gives the broth a thick and glistening texture. Since this soup is also popular across Indonesia as everyday soup served in common Indonesian households, various versions exist. This include a halal version, which replaces pork trotters with cow's trotters, ribs or bony parts of beef. A variant called sayur asem kacang merah uses beef-based broth and tamarind-based soup similar to sayur asem to add sour freshness.

See also

 List of soups
 Brongkos

References

External links
 Brenebon soup recipe
 Brenebon soup cooking video

Manado cuisine
Dutch fusion cuisine
Indonesian soups